Nurinisso Usmanova (born 3 April 2001) is an Uzbekistani rhythmic gymnast. In 2018, she won the silver medal in team event at the 2018 Asian Games held in Jakarta, Indonesia.

She began learning rhythmic gymnastics at age four.

References

External links 
 

Living people
2001 births
Place of birth missing (living people)
Uzbekistani rhythmic gymnasts
Gymnasts at the 2018 Asian Games
Medalists at the 2018 Asian Games
Asian Games silver medalists for Uzbekistan
Asian Games medalists in gymnastics
Islamic Solidarity Games competitors for Uzbekistan
21st-century Uzbekistani women